Wyoming Highway 93 (WYO 93) is a  north–south (northwest-southeast) Wyoming State Road located in central Converse County northwest of Douglas.

Route description
Wyoming Highway 94 begins at Wyoming Highway 59 on the western edge of Douglas, just north of exit 140 of Interstate 25. Highway 93 heads west, and then turns northwest as briefly parallels I-25/US 20/US 26/US 87 before turning north. Highway 93 turns back northwest again as it now parallels railroad track through the community of Morton, and heads to head to the community of Orpha. WYO 93 then turns due north, named Highland Loop Road, as Converse CR 31 (Ross Road) runs northwest. Approximately 8 miles later WYO 93 ends at an intersection with Converse CR 32 (Highland Loop Road) which continues the roadway and Converse CR 33 (Willow Creek Road).

Major intersections

References

Official 2003 State Highway Map of Wyoming

External links 

Wyoming State Routes 000-099
WYO 93 - WYO 59 to WYO 95
WYO 93 - WYO 95 to Converse CR 32

Transportation in Converse County, Wyoming
093